Osborne Hart (born 1952) is an American socialist activist. Hart was the vice-presidential nominee of the Socialist Workers Party in the 2016 presidential election. He has run for several other offices, including for mayor of Philadelphia in 2015.

Hart's father was a career soldier and he traveled extensively as a youth. His activism began in the 1960s during the Civil Rights Movement. He has also been active in the solidarity movement with socialist Cuba and other political movements.

References

1952 births
Living people
African-American candidates for Vice President of the United States
Socialist Workers Party (United States) vice presidential nominees
Socialist Workers Party (United States) politicians from Pennsylvania
Politicians from Philadelphia
2016 United States vice-presidential candidates
21st-century African-American politicians
21st-century American politicians
20th-century African-American people